The 28th Street Crew was a short-lived house-music group featuring David Cole and Robert Clivillés, who previously used the alias The Done Properly Posse!

In 1989, the group released a single and album (the latter of which was titled I Need a Rhythm) on Vendetta/A&M Records. This single would later be featured in the video game Grand Theft Auto: San Andreas on the fictional radio station SF-UR in 2004. Also in 1989, Clivillés and Cole started (the much more successful) C+C Music Factory

The 28th Street Crew released a single called "O'" in 1994 on the Ministry of Sound label.

References

External links
The 28th St. Crew—I Need A Rhythm (1989) - The Isle of Deserted Pop Stars

American house music duos
A&M Records artists